Brigadier General Cary C. Chun (born August 23, 1963) is a retired senior officer of the United States Air Force. He served as the Deputy Commander, Operations and Interagency Integration, Joint Functional Component Command for Space, United States Strategic Command (USSTRATCOM), and the Director for Mission Operations, National Reconnaissance Office. In this role, he led all Department of Defense space forces aligned with USSTRATCOM and provided tailored, responsive, local and global effects in support of national, USSTRATCOM and combatant commander objectives. As Director for Mission Operations, he led operations for all NRO overhead reconnaissance systems, ground stations, operational communications, and the operations center used to conduct intelligence activities essential for the national security of the United States and its allies.

Chun is the first United States Air Force general of Filipino descent. He retired from the air force on August 1, 2012.

Early life
Chun was born in Cavite, Philippines, at Sangley Point Naval Air Station, where his father was on active duty in the United States Coast Guard. He graduated from Amador Valley High School in 1981. He was commissioned as a second lieutenant from the United States Air Force Academy in 1985.

Military career
Chun gained extensive space operations experience working with United States Space Command, Air Force Space Command, 14th Air Force, the National Reconnaissance Office and Central Air Forces. He is a graduate of the Space Warfare Center's Space Tactics School. Additionally, he has supported the President and First Lady as a White House social aide.

Chun commanded the 614th Space Operations Squadron at Vandenberg AFB, California; NRO Operations Group at Onizuka Air Force Station, California; Space Operations Wing at the Aerospace Data Facility, Buckley AFB, Colorado; and 50th Space Wing, Schriever AFB, Colorado. He has also served as the Director of Space Forces while deployed to Southwest Asia for operations Enduring Freedom and Iraqi Freedom.

Education
 1985 Bachelor of Science degree in operations research, U.S. Air Force Academy, Colorado Springs, Colorado
 1987 Master of Science degree in systems management, University of Southern California, Los Angeles
 1990 Master of Science degree in space operations, Air Force Institute of Technology, Wright-Patterson AFB, Ohio
 1991 Distinguished graduate, Squadron Officer School, Maxwell AFB, Alabama
 1996 Distinguished graduate, Space Tactics School, Space Warfare Center, Schriever AFB, Colorado
 1997 Air Command and Staff College, Maxwell AFB, Alabama
 1998 Armed Forces Staff College, Norfolk, Virginia
 2003 Master of Strategic Studies degree, Air War College, Maxwell AFB, Alabama
 2006 Leadership Development, Center for Creative Leadership, Greensboro, North Carolina
 2007 Enterprise Leadership Seminar, Kenan-Flagler School of Business, University of North Carolina at Chapel Hill
 2008 Senior Executive Fellow, John F. Kennedy School of Government, Harvard University, Cambridge, Massachusetts

Assignments
 May 1985 – August 1987, contract manager, Satellite Control Network Activation, Onizuka Air Force Station, California
 August 1987 – May 1989, Operations Director, Special Programs Division, Onizuka AFS, California
 May 1989 – December 1990, student, Air Force Institute of Technology, Wright-Patterson AFB, Ohio
 January 1991 – June 1992, chief of Systems Analysis Branch, Los Angeles AFB, California
 June 1992 – August 1993, chief of Integration, Test and Operations Division, Los Angeles AFB, California
 August 1993 – September 1994, program manager for advanced tactical applications, Fort Myer, Virginia
 September 1994 – January 1996, executive officer, National Reconnaissance Office, Washington, D.C.
 January 1996 – June 1996, student, Space Tactics School, Space Warfare Center, Schriever AFB, Colorado
 August 1996 – June 1997, student, Air Command and Staff College, Maxwell AFB, Alabama
 June 1997 – June 1999, chief of Special Operations Section, Cheyenne Mountain Air Station, Colorado
 June 1999 – May 2000, operations officer, 76th Space Operations Squadron, Schriever AFB, Colorado
 May 2000 – June 2002, commander of 614th Space Operations Squadron, Vandenberg AFB, California
 July 2002 – June 2003, student, Air War College, Maxwell AFB, Alabama
 June 2003 – June 2005, commander of Operations Group, National Reconnaissance Office, Onizuka AFS, California
 July 2005 – August 2007, commander of Space Operations Wing, Aerospace Data Facility, Buckley AFB, Colorado
 January 2007 – June 2007, director of Space Forces, Combined Air and Space Operations Center, Central Air Forces, Southwest Asia
 August 2007 – June 2008, executive officer to the commander of Air Force Space Command, Peterson AFB, Colorado
 June 2008 – September 2009, commander of 50th Space Wing, Schriever AFB, Colorado
 September 2009 – August 2012, deputy commander of operations and interagency integration, Joint Functional Component Command for Space, U.S. Strategic Command, and director for mission operations, National Reconnaissance Office, Chantilly, Virginia

Achievements

Major awards and decorations
Defense Superior Service Medal with oak leaf cluster
Legion of Merit
Defense Meritorious Service Medal with two oak leaf clusters
Meritorious Service Medal with oak leaf cluster
Joint Service Commendation Medal
Air Force Commendation Medal with oak leaf cluster
Joint Service Achievement Medal
Air Force Achievement Medal

Other
1991, Outstanding squadron graduate, Squadron Officer School
1997, Top 25 percent graduate, Air Command and Staff College
2000, Field Grade Officer of the Year, California Air Force Association
2005, National Reconnaissance Office Leadership Award
2006, Office of the Secretary of the Air Force Leadership Award
2007, National Security Agency Bronze Medallion
2007, National Reconnaissance Office Gold Medal

References

United States Air Force generals
Living people
Recipients of the Legion of Merit
United States Air Force Academy alumni
1963 births
Recipients of the Defense Superior Service Medal
Air Force Institute of Technology alumni
Air War College alumni
University of Southern California alumni
People from Pleasanton, California
Military personnel from California